Hoifu Energy Group Limited is a Bermuda-incorporated energy and financial-sector holding company. The company headquartered in Hong Kong and listed its shares on The Stock Exchange of Hong Kong.

History
Karl Thomson Holdings Limited was incorporated in Bermuda and registered as a "Registered non-Hong Kong company" in Hong Kong since 30 May 2000. In January 2013, the company was renamed to Hoifu Energy Group Limited, as well as adding a registered Chinese name. The company had a Chinese trading name  before 2013.

Karl Thomson Holdings was the parent company of Hong Kong-based Karl Thomson Financial Group, which was founded by Lam Kwok Hing. Its core subsidiaries, Karl-Thomson Securities and Karl-Thomson Commodities, were founded in 1991.

In September 2006, an associate company (20% stake) of Karl Thomson Holdings, Aminex Petroleum, acquired the exploration and production rights of an oil field in Egypt. In November 2006, the company acquired Australia-listed company Volant Petroleum, a manufacturer for oil-industry. In 2011, it was reported that Karl Thomson Holdings temporary suspended the operation in Egypt due to Egyptian revolution of 2011.

Subsidiaries and divisions
 Karl Thomson Financial Group
  (former)

References

External links
 

Companies listed on the Hong Kong Stock Exchange
Offshore companies of Bermuda
Holding companies of Bermuda
Holding companies of Hong Kong
Financial services companies of Hong Kong
Oil and gas companies of Hong Kong
2000 establishments in Bermuda